Bona Mansio Island is the ice-covered island extending 750 m in east–west direction and 635 m in south–north direction lying in Papazov Passage, Biscoe Islands. The island is separated from the west coast of Krogh Island by a 700 m long passage narrowing to 50 m at points. Its surface area is 30 ha. The feature was formed as a result of the retreat of Krogh Island's ice cap around the turn of 21st century.

The island is named after the ancient Roman road station of Bona Mansio in Southern Bulgaria.

Location

Maps
 British Antarctic Territory. Scale 1:200000 topographic map. DOS 610 Series, Sheet W 66 66. Directorate of Overseas Surveys, UK, 1976
 Antarctic Digital Database (ADD). Scale 1:250000 topographic map of Antarctica. Scientific Committee on Antarctic Research (SCAR). Since 1993, regularly upgraded and updated

See also
 List of Antarctic and subantarctic islands

Notes

References
 Bona Mansio Island. SCAR Composite Gazetteer of Antarctica
 Bulgarian Antarctic Gazetteer. Antarctic Place-names Commission. (details in Bulgarian, basic data in English)

External links
 Bona Mansio Island. Adjusted Copernix satellite image

Islands of the Biscoe Islands
Bulgaria and the Antarctic